K in Kortrijk is a shopping centre in the Belgian city of Kortrijk. The centre, located downtown, was developed by Foruminvest at a cost of €200,000,000. The shopping mall comprises  of shopping space, 90 shops and a tower with apartments. It is one of the biggest downtown shopping centres in Belgium. The mall opened 11 March 2010. It is currently owned by the German Union Investment Real Estate group.

A downtown urban renewal project
The shopping centre and the 40 apartments were constructed on a site, situated in a downtown quarter, which formerly housed a primary school, a high school (Onze-Lieve-Vrouw van Bijstand), an elderly home and a convent.

In December 2009, the shopping centre was sold by Foruminvest to the German Union Investment Real Estate company.

Construction
Construction works started in August 2007.

The opening of the shopping centre was scheduled to happen during the fall of 2009, but was later postponed to spring 2010.

Pictures of the construction site (2007–2010)

External links
Official website K in Kortrijk
Information provided by the City Development Company Kortrijk (Stadsontwikkelingsbedrijf Kortrijk) (in dutch)
information provided by the city of Kortrijk (in dutch)

Shopping malls in Kortrijk